John Hegre Discography

Solo albums
2003: A Nice Place To Leave (Dekorder)
2005: Snow King (Rape Art) 
2006: Colors don´t clash (Dekorder)

Collaborations 

As John Hegre/Lasse Marhaug/Helge Sten
1999: The Comfort of Objects (Ohm Records)

With Der Brief
1999: Volum (Jazzassin Records)

With Kaptein Kaliber
1999: Terry (Kaptein Kaliber Records)
2002: Pop Ultra (Tellè Records)
2002: Pop Ultra 2 (Tellè Records)
2003: Pop Ultra 2B (Tellè Records)
2007: Hjelp (Karisma Records)
2012: Forvirring, Samfunnets Lim (YAP)

As John Hegre/Lasse Marhaug
2002: Acoustic (Authorised Version)

As John Hegre/Lasse Marhaug/Y Yoshida
2002: Saturday Night Groove Sessions (Xerxes)

With The Golden Serenades
2003: Super Cheap 1 $ (Gameboy Records)
2003: II (Gameboy Records)
2005: The Swan (Abisko)
2005: Navilandia (Argentina)
2007: Morning Star/Evening Fix (LP) 2007 (Segerhuva), with Testicle Hazard
2008: The Golden Serenades/Sewer Election & Treriksröstet (Roggbiff Records)
2008: Kavardàk (Rumpus Records)
2009: Hamond Pops (+3dB)
2012: The Age Of Swing (A Dear Girl Called Wendy)

As John Hegre/Maja Ratkje
2005: Ballads (Dekorder)

As John Hegre/Howard Stelzer
2007: The Boring Leading The Bored (humbug)

As John Hegre/Lene Grenager/Harald Fetveit/Else Olsen S 
2009: Ute (AIM)

As John Hegre & Marcelo Aguirre & Die Polizei
2009: Live at Adolf 666 (soopa records)

With Jazzkammer
1999: Timex (Rune Grammofon)
2000: Hot Action Sexy Karaoke (Ground Fault Records)
2001: Live at Molde International Jazz Festival (STS), with Merzbow
2001: Sound of Music (Ohm Records)
2002: Pancakes (Smalltown Supersound)
2003: New Water (Ohm Records)
2003: Pulse (Bottrop-boy)
2005: Mort Aux Vaches (Staalplaat)
2005: Jazzkammer/Opec (Reverse Recordings)
2006: Panic (CD), 2006 (Bottrop-boy)
2006: Fun For None (Load Records), with VA
2007: Tomorrow No One Will Be Safe (PACREC), with Howard Stelzer

With Jazkamer
2005: Ninguna Diversion (Utech Records)
2005: Bento Box (Abisko)
2006: Proud To Be Un American (Gameboy Records)
2007: Eat Shit (Asspiss Records)
2007: Balls The Size Of Texas, Liver The Size Of Brazil (Purplesoil)
2007: Motorcycle Fuck With The Ghost Rider (Archive), with Astro/Hair Stylistics
2007: Jazkamer/Smegma Split (No Fun Productions)
2008: Artbreaker (Smalltown Supersound)
2010: Solitary Nail (PicaDisk)
2010: Musica Non Grata (PicaDisk)
2010: The Monroe Doctrine (PicaDisk)
2010: Chestnut Thornback Tar (PicaDisk/Type records)
2010: Peanuts (PicaDisk)
2010: Cover By Hairstylistics (PicaDisk)
2010: We Want Epic Drama (PicaDisk)
2010: Self Portrait (PicaDisk)
2010: Matthew 28:17 (PicaDisk)
2010: Failed State Of Mind (PicaDisk/Robert&Leopold)
2010: Metal Music Machine 2 (PicaDisk)
2010: The Young Persons Guide To Jazkamer (PicaDisk)

With Rehab
2008: Man under train situation (+3dB)

With BlackPackers
2009: All Ears Bleed (Ritte Ritte Ross)

With Tralten Eller Utpult
2013: Tralten Eller Utpult (Kassett)

With NOXAGT
2014: Brutage (Drid Machine)

With Irabagon, Hegre & Drønen
2017: Axis (Rune Grammofon)

References

External links 
John Hegre at Audiatur festival

John Hegre albums